Generalization is the formulation of a general concept from specific instances.

Generalization may also refer to:

Generalization (learning), a concept in learning theory
Faulty generalization, an informal fallacy
Universal generalization, a rule in predicate logic

See also

 Genericization, a process where a trademark becomes a generic trademark